Fly on the Wall is a video by AC/DC, released in 1985. It is named after their album with the same name. The tape consisted of a single music video of five of the songs from Fly on the Wall, back to back. The visuals involved AC/DC playing at a bar while various shady characters interacted with an animated fly, much like the one on the cover of the album. The track listing is as follows:

"Fly on the Wall"
"Danger"
"Sink the Pink"
"Stand Up"
"Shake Your Foundations"

Plot
A thunderstorm rumbles across Brooklyn, where AC/DC is about to play. In a bar across the bay and the Brooklyn Bridge, a cameraman spy, nicknamed Super Snoop, walks in from the bar's back door, trying to walk slowly toward the band's dressing room. His job being to get photographs of the band for a local newspaper.

He finds the door half-opened, and takes a good picture, in this case, the camera pops loud and shines brightly. The popping sound gets the band's attention. Two guards behind the spy grab him, thinking he works for the Paparazzi. Photography is prohibited in the bar. The twin-coated guards throw Super Snoop out of the bar by the bay. An animated fly flies out of an empty can within the garbage that Super Snoop is thrown onto. The freaky picture-taker throws an empty box at one of the guards, and quickly runs off.

The fly heads inside the bar, called the "Crystal Ballroom". Meanwhile, inside the Crystal Ballroom, the MC known as Decadent Dan (a name taken from the lyrics to "Send For the Man") heads onto the stage, and introduces AC/DC to the bar by the bay. He forgets their name and calls out "What's the band's name?". He is replied with AC/DC and states "What are you guys, an electric company? Na I'm kidding!" After his quick introduction, the band heads on stage and plays their song "Fly on the Wall". Over the course of the night, Decadent Dan repeatedly tries to pick up women, but ends up being slapped on the face by each woman he talks to.

The bartender nearby, is annoyed by the band's intro guitar sounds, and puts on earplugs. Outside, Super Snoop heads inside through the back gate. During the song "Danger", he is back inside. He takes a few good pictures of employees and AC/DC fans/customers, even a picture of the band as well. During Angus Young's solo, the grey-haired cameraman says "Scumbag punks... rock trash!" as he writes down his impressions of the band.

After taking another picture, Super Snoop is picked up again by the same guards that threw him out before, and thrown out. The next song, "Sink the Pink", features a woman in pink. She plays a game of Pool with another guy. The woman wins, and then dances with the former champ.

As the next song, "Stand Up", begins, a car pulls up and five people in business suits step out. They then march in unison into the Crystal Ballroom and sit at a table. Super Snoop heads in the back door again. He takes another picture of them, and laughs hysterically. Then once again, is thrown out again by the guards. Before heading inside, the guards look at the freaky spy, seeing him with his hands on his cheeks, crying.

Inside the bar, the last song, "Shake Your Foundations", is played, and everyone dances. A woman named Fifi Fridge asks Decadent Dan to dance with her. He is surprised, but delighted. This song gets louder and louder as the audience gets more into it. The bartender, however, finds the song very interesting, and quickly takes off his earplugs, and joins all the people in dancing. But, during the song, the bar quakes. Finally, with the bar quaking violently, spirit bottles start falling off the shelves behind the bar, the walls begin to breach and it quickly gets the people's attention. They all run out of the bar. Super Snoop, trying to head back inside, is run over by the crowd. Decadent Dan throws Fifi Fridge over his shoulder and runs out of the bar with her. The bar collapses, and AC/DC continue to play the song now fully exposed outside with the World Trade Center clearly visible behind them. Finally, the song is over, and the fly featured in the videos, flies away. One more song, "Playing With Girls", is played during the credits.

This entire sequence (minus "Playing With Girls/Credits") can be found on disc 2 of the band's 2005 Family Jewels DVD compilation.

Personnel
Brian Johnson - vocals
Angus Young - lead guitar
Malcolm Young - rhythm guitar, backing vocals
Cliff Williams - bass guitar, backing vocals
Simon Wright - drums, percussion

See also
Fly on the Wall

AC/DC video albums
AC/DC live albums
1985 video albums
Music video compilation albums
1985 live albums
1985 compilation albums